The Denham Hospitality Summer Classic was a bonspiel, or curling tournament, that took place at the Leduc Curling Club in Leduc, Alberta, Canada. The tournament was held in a round robin format. The tournament only existed for one season, in 2013, as part of the World Curling Tour.

Past champions
Only skip's name is displayed.

Men

Women

External links

Leduc Curling Club Home

Former World Curling Tour events
Leduc, Alberta
Curling in Alberta